Sir Charles Leonard Woolley (17 April 1880 – 20 February 1960) was a British archaeologist best known for his excavations at Ur in Mesopotamia. He is recognized as one of the first "modern" archaeologists who excavated in a methodical way, keeping careful records, and using them to reconstruct ancient life and history. Woolley was knighted in 1935 for his contributions to the discipline of archaeology. He married the British archaeologist Katharine Woolley.

Early life
Woolley was the son of a clergyman, and was brother to Geoffrey Harold Woolley, VC, and George Cathcart Woolley. He was born at 13 Southwold Road, Upper Clapton, in the modern London Borough of Hackney and educated at St John's School, Leatherhead and New College, Oxford. He was interested in excavations from a young age.

Career

In 1905, Woolley became assistant of the Ashmolean Museum, Oxford. Volunteered by Arthur Evans to run the excavations on the Roman site at Corbridge (near Hadrian's Wall) for Francis Haverfield, Woolley began his excavation career there in 1906, later admitting in Spadework that "I had never studied archaeological methods even from books ... and I had not any idea how to make a survey or a ground-plan" (Woolley 1953:15). Nevertheless, the Corbridge Lion was found under his supervision.

Woolley next travelled to Nubia in southern Egypt, where he worked with David Randall-MacIver on the Eckley Coxe Expedition to Nubia conducted under the auspices of the University of Pennsylvania Museum. Between 1907 and 1911 they conducted archaeological excavations and survey at sites including Areika, Buhen, and the Meroitic town of Karanog. In 1912–1914, with T. E. Lawrence as his assistant, he excavated the Hittite city of Carchemish in Syria. Lawrence and Woolley were apparently working for British Naval Intelligence and monitoring the construction of Germany's Berlin-to-Baghdad railway.

During World War I, Woolley, with Lawrence, was posted to Cairo, where he met Gertrude Bell. He then moved to Alexandria, where he was assigned to work on naval espionage. Turkey captured a ship he was on, and held him for two years in a relatively comfortable prisoner-of-war camp. He received the Croix de Guerre from France at the war's end.

In the following years, Woolley returned to Carchemish, and then worked at Amarna in Egypt.

Excavation at Ur 
Woolley led a joint expedition of the British Museum and the University of Pennsylvania to Ur, beginning in 1922, which included his wife, the British archaeologist Katharine Woolley. There, they made important discoveries, including the Copper Bull and the Bull-Headed Lyre. in the course of excavating the royal cemetery and the pair of Ram in a Thicket figurines. Agatha Christie's novel, Murder in Mesopotamia, was inspired by the discovery of the royal tombs.  Agatha Christie later married Woolley's young assistant, Max Mallowan.
	
Ur was the burial site of what may have been many Sumerian royals. The Woolleys discovered tombs of great material wealth, containing large paintings of ancient Sumerian culture at its zenith, along with gold and silver jewellery, cups and other furnishings. The most extravagant tomb was that of "Queen" Pu-Abi. Amazingly enough, Queen Pu-Abi's tomb was untouched by looters. Inside the tomb, many well-preserved items were found, including a cylindrical seal bearing her name in Sumerian. Her body was found buried along with those of two attendants, who had presumably been poisoned to continue to serve her after death. Woolley was able to reconstruct Pu-Abi's funeral ceremony from objects found in her tomb.

Excavation at Al Mina and Tell Atchana 
In 1936, after the discoveries at Ur, Woolley was interested in finding ties between the ancient Aegean and Mesopotamian civilisations. This led him to the Syrian city of Al Mina. He excavated Tell Atchana in the years 1937–1939 and 1946–1949. His team discovered palaces, temples, private houses and fortification walls, in 17 archaeological levels, reaching from late Early Bronze Age (c. 2200–2000 BC) to Late Bronze Age (c. 13th century BC). Among their finds was the inscribed statue of Idrimi, a king of Alalakh c. early 15th century BC.

Local Genesis flood theory 
Woolley was one of the first archaeologists to propose that the flood described in the Book of Genesis was local after identifying a flood-stratum at Ur "400 miles long and 100 miles wide; but for the occupants of the valley that was the whole world".

World War II 
His archaeological career was interrupted by the United Kingdom's entry into World War II, and he became part of the Monuments, Fine Arts and Archives Section of the Allied armies. After the war, he returned to Alalakh, where he continued to work from 1946 until 1949.

Personal life

Woolley married Katharine Elizabeth Keeling (née Menke; born June 1888 – died 8 November 1945), who was born in England to German parents and had previously been married to Lieut. Col. Bertram Francis Eardley Keeling (OBE, MC). He had hired Keeling in 1924 as expedition artist and draughtswoman; they married in 1927 and she continued to play an important role at his archaeological sites.

Woolley died on 20 February 1960 at age 79.

Publications

 republished by Penguin Books, revised 1950, 1952

 , based on talks originally broadcast by the BBC

Syria as a Link Between East and West, 1936

  (with Jaquetta Hawkes)

References

Sources 
 Crawford, Harriet. Ur: The City of the Moon God. London: Bloomsbury, 2015. 
 Winstone, H. V. F. (1990). Woolley of Ur. London: Secker and Warburg.
The Ancient Near Eastern World Oxford 2005

External links
 
 PBS (WNET, New York): "The Rape of Europa." 24 November 2008.

1880 births
1960 deaths
People educated at St John's School, Leatherhead
Alumni of New College, Oxford
20th-century archaeologists
20th-century English writers
Archaeologists of the Near East
British Army personnel of World War II
Woolley, Charles Leonard
English Assyriologists
Knights Bachelor
Monuments men
People associated with the British Museum
People from Upper Clapton
World War I spies for the United Kingdom
British World War I prisoners of war
World War I prisoners of war held by the Ottoman Empire
Recipients of the Croix de Guerre 1914–1918 (France)
Royal Navy personnel of World War I